A total lunar eclipse will occur on Sunday, February 22, 2054.

This eclipse is the first of an almost tetrad, the others being 18 Aug 2054 (T), 11 Feb 2055 (T) and 7 August 2055 (P).

Visibility 

The entire eclipse will be visible in most of the Americas. Most or some of the eclipse will be visible in westernmost South America, Europe, the western half of Africa, easternmost Asia, and most of Oceania.

Related lunar eclipses 
This eclipse is part of Lunar Saros 124.

Lunar year series

See also 
List of lunar eclipses and List of 21st-century lunar eclipses

External links 
 

2054-02
2054-02
2054 in science